Thou Shalt Not Kill ... Except, also known as Stryker's War, is a 1985 American action horror film directed by Josh Becker and starring Robert Rickman, John Manfredi, Tim Quill, Cheryl Hausen, Perry Mallette and Sam Raimi. It was written by Becker and Scott Spiegel from a story by Becker, actor Bruce Campbell, and Sheldon Lettich.

The cast of the film consists largely of unknowns, because most of the smaller roles are filled by Becker's friends and relatives. Some, however, have been featured in other films, largely those produced by Renaissance Pictures or otherwise involving Sam Raimi, Bruce Campbell or Josh Becker.

The film held its premiere in Warren, Michigan on October 13, 1985, and was later released to video in West Germany and Japan on 21 May 1987, followed by Canada on March 31, 1999. The low budget film is fairly obscure, but maintains a small following as an underground cult classic.

Plot

Having come home after half of his squadron was killed during the Vietnam War, Sergeant Jack Stryker (portrayed by Brian Schulz), given an honorable discharge due to his injuries, attempts to get his life back together. Finding himself reunited with an old girlfriend, Sally (Cheryl Hausen) and his war buddies, he feels he may have successfully re-established his life. However, this happiness is quickly cut short when a murderous cult led by an enigmatic but unnamed Charles Manson-like figure, portrayed by director and writer Sam Raimi, comes into town to continue their rampage.

After Sally is tortured and Stryker and his compatriots find the cult torturing police officers near his house, they arm themselves up and decide to - as the trailer puts it - "break the laws of both God (the title is a reference to one of the Biblical Ten Commandments) and man" and fight back. What follows is a war between the two groups, ending in numerous deaths, including the cult leader's; the exchange between the cult leader and Stryker is as follows:

Upon which Stryker shoots Raimi's character in the chest, and he careens into a river, eventually being impaled on a motorcycle, and their brutal war is ended.

Cast

Stryker's group 
 Brian Schulz as Sergeant Jack Stryker
 Robert Rickman as Sgt. Walker J. Jackson
 John Manfredi as 2nd Lt. David Miller
 Tim Quill as Lt. Cpt. Tim Tyler
 Cheryl Hausen as Sally
 Perry Mallette as Otis
 Pam Lewis as Mom
 Jim Griffen as Dad

Cult Members 
 Sam Raimi as cult leader
 Connie Craig as bald cult girl
 Ivitch Fraser as young cult girl
 Terry-Lynn Brumfield as sleazy cult girl
 Ted Raimi as Chain Man
 Kirk Haas as the Stabber
 Al Johnston as big biker
 Chuck Morris as puke biker
 Scott Mitchell as Mad Hatter
 Scott Spiegel as Pincushion
 Glenn Barr as Archer
 Marek Pacholec as Bat Man

Others/Uncredited 
 David Kelly
 Gary Jones
 Josh Becker as hood crushed under the car/shot cult leader (uncredited)
 Bruce Campbell as video newscaster (uncredited)
 Don Campbell as Marine (uncredited)

Production

Thou Shalt Not Kill... Except was originally produced in 1980 as a Super-8 film entitled Stryker's War, designed to get interest from investors; Campbell and Becker drafted the story ideas while returning home from the Tennessee set of The Evil Dead. The interior sets were primarily Bruce Campbell's garage in suburban Detroit, Michigan, dressed up as either a military base or Stryker's house. The Vietnam scenes were filmed in Hartland, though the overhead shots consist solely of stock footage.

Bruce Campbell also served as assistant sound editor on the film, where he re-used many of the Foley effects created for The Evil Dead. The film's release was, like The Evil Dead, handled primarily by press agent Irvin Shapiro. Shapiro suggested the final title, over Becker's objections; this is similar to Shapiro's summary retitling of The Book of the Dead to The Evil Dead.

Release 
Thou Shalt Not Kill... Except was given a limited release theatrically in the United States by Film World Distributors in 1985.

The film was released on VHS by Starmaker Video in the late 1980s. It was later released on DVD in the United States by Anchor Bay Entertainment in 2002.  This version is currently out of print. On April 10, 2012 Synapse released a Blu-ray/DVD combo pack of the film containing a new transfer and extras.

Legacy

Following 
A small but devoted cult following has arisen around this film. Josh Becker's website is notable for comments of some fans of the film, who hail it as one of the great works in American filmography. Some groups have even devoted significant new artwork to the film, including reimaging the soundtrack, re-editing the film and other "tributes". One of the best known fans group, based in Stockton, California, have commemorated the film through communal art projects, featuring extravagant parties to debut their creations; a tradition that has now lasted over 15 years.

In popular culture 
The dialogue between Stryker and the cult leader - where the latter declares: "I am Jesus Christ", and Stryker retorts: "No you're not...you're dead" - is sampled at the beginning of the Entombed song Out of Hand, from the album Wolverine Blues.

References

External links 
 
 
 Becker, Josh. Campbell, Bruce: Thou Shalt Not Kill... Except DVD audio commentary.

1985 films
American horror thriller films
American action thriller films
1985 horror films
Vietnam War films
Films directed by Josh Becker
1980s action thriller films
American action horror films
American exploitation films
1980s exploitation films
American films about revenge
Films about cults
American vigilante films
1980s English-language films
1980s American films